Elk Mound is a kame, a type of irregularly shaped hill formed by glacial debris, in northwestern Wisconsin. It has an elevation of over 1,200 feet above sea level. The hill lends its name to the village of Elk Mound, Wisconsin, as well as the Town of Elk Mound.

History
Elk bones were found at the mound by early settlers, hence the name.

References

External links
History of Elk Mound
Topographical Map of Elk Mound (1207 ft 368 m)

Hills of Wisconsin
Landforms of Dunn County, Wisconsin